Cerynea ochreana is a species of moth in the family Erebidae first described by George Thomas Bethune-Baker in 1908. It is found in Papua New Guinea.

References 

Boletobiinae
Moths of Papua New Guinea